Ratomir Vićentić (August 5, 1939 – July 14, 2009) was a Serbian professor and professional basketball player.

Basketball career 
Vićentić spent entire career playing for Crvena zvezda of the Yugoslav Federal League. He played from 1958 to 1965. Also, he played for the Crvena zvezda youth system.

Vićentić was a member of the Yugoslavia national basketball team that won the bronze medal at the 1963 Mediterranean Games in Naples, Italy.

Post-playing career 
After retirement in 1965, Vićentić was a technical director for the Crvena zvezda until 1972.

Personal life 
Vićentić moved to Belgrade in 1950 where he graduated at the University of Belgrade with major in mechanical engineering. He was a professor and the head of the Belgrade Polytechnic School.

See also 
 List of KK Crvena zvezda players with 100 games played

References

1939 births
2009 deaths
Competitors at the 1959 Mediterranean Games
KK Crvena zvezda players
Mediterranean Games bronze medalists for Yugoslavia
Serbian men's basketball players
Sportspeople from Kraljevo
Yugoslav men's basketball players
Mediterranean Games medalists in basketball
Centers (basketball)